The Horahora River is a short river of Northland, New Zealand. It flows into the Pacific at Ngunguru Bay, three kilometres south of Ngunguru.

See also
List of rivers of New Zealand

References

Kaipara District
Rivers of the Northland Region
Rivers of New Zealand